"1762 leto" (  or ;   or) is a song written by Grigor Parlichev, a Macedonian Bulgarian writer.

The song describes the abolition of the Bulgarian Archbishopric of Ohrid, which took place in 1767, and the departure of its last archbishop Arsenius II from Ohrid. It was very popular in Macedonia, and especially in Ohrid, in the last decades of the nineteenth century. It was first performed in Ohrid shortly after Parlichev's wedding c. 1870. According to Parlichev and other contemporaries, the song contributed more to the final victory of the Bulgarian national movement in Macedonia against the Ecumenical Patriarchate of Constantinople than many of the previous efforts of the Bulgarians.

The text of the song with minor changes was published for the first time by Vasil Kanchov in Sofia in 1891. The song was originally published in the Bulgarian periodical science magazine "Collection of folklore, science and literature" in Sofia, Bulgaria (1894).

In 1953 the song was translated and published for the first time in Macedonian by Todor Dimitrovski in "Avtobiografija; Serdarot, Skopje, 1953, Kočo Racin", to mark the 60th anniversary of his death.

Numerous versions of the song have been recorded by Macedonian and Bulgarian performers over the years. Popular performances include those by the Macedonian folk band Ansambl Biljana in 1974 and the alternative band Mizar in 1991.

References

External links
 The song  performed by Mitko Koljshevski and Venko Pasovski from Ohrid, Macedonia.
 The full text of the song in Parlichev's Autobiography.

Bulgarian songs
Macedonian songs
1894 songs